Baap Ji is an upcoming Indian Bhojpuri-language  action comedy drama film directed by Dev Pandey and produced by Ramjit Jaiswal under his production house "Govinda & Sagar Films Entertainment". The stars Khesari Lal Yadav in the lead role and Ritu Singh in the opposite role. While Manoj Singh Tiger, C P Bhatt, Brijesh Tripathi, Saheb Lal Dhari, Abhay Rai, Prakash Jais, Sanjay Verma, Ritu Pandey and others in supporting roles. Kajal Raghwani make a special appearance in a song.

Cast
 Khesari Lal Yadav
 Ritu Singh
 Manoj Tiger
 Kajal Raghwani
 CP Bhatt
 Brijesh Tripathi
 Prakash Jais
 Sanjay Verma
 Ritu Pandey
 Saheb Lal Dhari
 Abhay Rai

Production
Filming started on 11 December 2019 in Lucknow, with mostly scenes shot at Bajardeeh village and Kaji Rudhauli village in Bansi tehsil, Shanteshwar Nath Tripathi's Haveli in Chetia State, Shri Ram Bilas Institute and Medical Sciences at Sonkhar in Naugarh tehsil in the Siddharthnagar district of Uttar Pradesh.

Music

The music of "Baap Ji" is given by Om Jha with lyrics penned by Pyare Lal Yadav, Kundan Preet, Arun Bihari and Yadav Raj. It is produced under the "Worldwide Records Bhojpuri" Music company, who also bought his satellite rights.

His first song "Machhriya" was released on 29 January 2021 on the official YouTube channel of "Worldwide Records Bhojpuri" and crossed over 4.5 million views.

Track list

References

Indian action comedy-drama films
Upcoming Bhojpuri-language films
Upcoming films